This is a list of professional wrestling attendance records on the independent circuit. There are many professional wrestling shows held at sporting events, often as part of half-time or post-game shows, or major public gatherings that have ranged from 12,000 to 35,000 people. The most attended live event of all-time, however, is All In which was attended by 11,263 fans. Co-promoted by Cody Rhodes and The Young Bucks (Matt Jackson and Nick Jackson), it was the first non-World Championship Wrestling or World Wrestling Entertainment event in the United States to sell 10,000 tickets since 1993.

The early-1990s were dominated by the United States Wrestling Association based in Memphis, Tennessee. With the close of the American Wrestling Association (1933-1991) and Pacific Northwest Wrestling (1925-1992), the USWA was the last remaining territory-era promotion in North America. Its biggest show during this period was Memphis Memories held at the Mid-South Coliseum before 8,377 on March 7, 1994, in which the Memphis Wrestling Hall of Fame was introduced. Within a few years, the USWA's position as the top independent promotion in North America was being challenged by other groups across Canada and the United States. The most successful of these were Smoky Mountain Wrestling (1991-1995) and Extreme Championship Wrestling (1992-2001). SMW's Superbowl of Wrestling, headlined by Shawn Michaels vs. Buddy Landel for the WWF Intercontinental Championship, was the biggest drawing show of 1995 with 5,000 fans in attendance. While SMW was forced to shut down in 1995, ECW survived to become a national touring promotion as part of the "Big 3" in pro wrestling.

By the early-21st century, a new generation of independent companies had emerged. The most prominent of these were Ring of Honor, Major League Wrestling, Northeast Wrestling and Juggalo Championship Wrestling. Canadian promotions such as Blood, Sweat & Ears, Border City Wrestling and Lutte 2000 were also represented for the first time. National Wrestling Alliance affiliates set a number of records as well. Following a successful international USO tour in 2000, NWA Mid-Atlantic Championship Wrestling held the first-ever American pro wrestling shows in China from December 30, 2003, to January 3, 2004. The first night of The Next Revolution tour drew 7,500 people at Tianhe Gymnasium. The next two events drew 6,100 at Huadu Stadium and 3,400 at Guangzhou Gymnasium respectively. WWE developmental territories Deep South Wrestling, Heartland Wrestling Association and Ohio Valley Wrestling also made an impact on the independent scene. OVW, which was booked by SMW founder Jim Cornette from 1999 until 2005, was arguably the most successful of the three with record-setting shows at Louisville Gardens and Six Flags Kentucky Kingdom.

Ring of Honor began holding regular pay-per-view (PPV) events via the Dish Network starting in 2007, and was acknowledged as the third major U.S. promotion following its national television deal with the Sinclair Broadcasting Group four years later. The 2010s saw the increasing influence of "lucha libre" in the industry with the debut of Lucha Libre USA (2010-2012) and Lucha Underground (2014-2018) on U.S. television. The Heroes of Lucha Libre, featuring Rey Mysterio Jr. vs. Richard Trumposo in the main event, was held at the Galen Center in Los Angeles, California on June 2, 2018, before 3,000 fans. It was the largest indy live event of the year (along with the Legends of Wrestling show at Detroit's Fraser Hockeyland) until the All In pay-per-view three months later.

Events and attendances
Note: Minimum attendance of 5,000.
Light Grey indicates event was a free show and/or held at a major public gathering.

Historical

1990s
Note: Extreme Championship Wrestling became a national touring company after holding its first pay-per-view (PPV) event, ECW Barely Legal, on April 13, 1997. In July 1999, ECW was acknowledged as the third major U.S. promotion by Pro Wrestling Illustrated following its national television deal with TNN.

2000s
Note: Ring of Honor became a national touring company in 2003 and began holding regular pay-per-view (PPV) events via the Dish Network starting with Respect Is Earned on July 1, 2007. ROH was acknowledged as the third major U.S. promotion following its national television deal with the Sinclair Broadcasting Group in May 2011.

2010s

2020s

Footnotes

See also
List of professional wrestling terms
List of professional wrestling memorial shows

References
General
 
 
 

Specific

Further reading

External links
Independent circuit attendance records at Wrestlingdata.com

 
Attendance records